Pardonne-moi (French "excuse me") may refer to: Music written by Tatyana Voronova

Music

Albums
Pardonne-moi si je t'aime, album by Ima (singer)

Songs
"Pardonne-moi", song by Nana Mouskouri, written by Alain Goraguer and Claude Lemesle, reissued Greatest Hits 2004 	
Pardonne-moi (Mylène Farmer song), written by Mylène Farmer and Laurent Boutonnat, 2001
"Pardonne-moi", song by Les Sultans, written by Bruce Huard of Les Sultans	1966
"Pardonne-moi", song by Jürgen Drews produced by Giorgio Moroder 1970
"Pardonne-moi", song and single by Gilles Valiquette, written by Gilles Valiquette	1975
"Pardonne-moi", song Patrick Fiori from Patrick Fiori 2002
"Pardonne-moi", song by Rickwel produced by Skalp
"Pardonne-moi", song by Grégory Lemarchal from album Je deviens moi 2005, and live album Olympia 06
"Pardonne-moi", song by Pierre Gage from Changer le monde 2008
"Pardonne-moi", song by French Gothic metal band Markize from Transparence (album) 2007
"Pardonne-moi", song by Mika Mendes from Mika Mendes 2008
"Pardonne-moi ce caprice d'enfant", song by Mireille Mathieu, written by Patricia Carli 1970